Oklahoma has ninety-six accredited private schools—twenty private schools accredited by the Oklahoma State Department of Education and seventy-six accredited by the Oklahoma Private School Accreditation Commission.

Schools accredited by the Oklahoma State Department of Education
Roman Catholic Archdiocese of Oklahoma City, Oklahoma City, Oklahoma County
Bishop Kelley High School, Tulsa, Tulsa County
Bishop McGuinness Catholic High School, Oklahoma City, Oklahoma County
Cascia Hall Preparatory School, Tulsa, Tulsa County
Cookson Hills Christian School, Kansas, Adair County
Corn Bible Academy, Corn, Washita County
Diocese Of Tulsa, Tulsa, Tulsa County
Jane Brooks School For The Deaf, Chickasha, Grady County
Lakeside School, Granite, Greer County
Metro Christian Academy (Oklahoma), Tulsa, Tulsa County
Monte Cassino School, Tulsa, Tulsa County
Mount Saint Mary High School, Oklahoma City, Oklahoma County
Oklahoma Job Corps Academy, Tulsa, Tulsa County
Oklahoma School for the Deaf, Sulphur, Murray County
Parkview-Ok. School For The Blind, Muskogee, Muskogee County
St. John Christian Heritage, Oklahoma City, Oklahoma County
St. Paul's Lutheran School (Oklahoma), Enid, Garfield County
Town And Country School, Tulsa, Tulsa County
The University School for Gifted and Talented Children at the University of Tulsa, Tulsa, Tulsa County
Victory Christian School, Tulsa, Tulsa County
Wesleyan Christian School, Bartlesville, Washington County

Schools accredited by the Oklahoma Private School Accreditation Commission
Academy of Classical Christian Studies, Oklahoma City, Oklahoma County
All Saints Catholic School, Broken Arrow, Tulsa County
All Saints Catholic School, Norman, Cleveland County
Ardmore Christian Academy, Ardmore, Carter County
Bishop John Carroll School, Oklahoma City, Oklahoma County
Bristow Adventist School, Bristow, Creek County
Casady School, Oklahoma City, Oklahoma County
Central Seventh-day Adventist, Oklahoma City, Oklahoma County
Christ the King Catholic School, Oklahoma City, Oklahoma County
Christian Heritage Academy, Del City, Oklahoma County
Claremore Adventist Elementary, Claremore, Rogers County
Claremore Christian School, Claremore, Rogers County
Corn Bible Academy, Corn, Washita County
Community Christian School, Norman, OK, Cleveland County
Crossings Christian School, Oklahoma City, Oklahoma County
Destiny Christian School, Oklahoma City, Oklahoma County
Eagle Point Christian Academy, Sapulpa, Creek County
Emmanuel Christian School (Oklahoma), Enid, Garfield County
Evangelistic Temple School, Tulsa, Tulsa County
Faith Academy Christian School, Midwest City, Oklahoma County
Family Of Faith Christian School, Shawnee, Pottawatomie County
First Lutheran School, Ponca City, Kay County
Good Shepherd Lutheran School, Midwest City, Oklahoma County
Grace Christian School, Broken Arrow, Tulsa County
Happy Hands Educational Center, Tulsa, Tulsa County
Harvest Christian School, Oklahoma City, Oklahoma County
Harvest Life School, Midwest City, Oklahoma County
Heritage Hall School, Oklahoma City, Oklahoma County
Hillsdale Christian School, Hillsdale, Garfield County
Holland Hall School, Tulsa, Tulsa County
Holy Family Cathedral School, Tulsa, Tulsa County
Holy Trinity School, Okarche, Kingfisher County
Immanuel Christian Academy, Broken Arrow, Tulsa County
Ketchum Adventist Academy, Vinita, Craig County
King's Gate Christian School, Oklahoma City, Oklahoma County
Lakewood Christian School, McAlester, Pittsburg County
Liberty Academy, Shawnee, Pottawatomie County
Life Christian Academy, Oklahoma City, Oklahoma County
Lawton Academy, Lawton, Oklahoma
Lincoln Christian School, Tulsa, Tulsa County
Little Light House, Tulsa, Tulsa County
Marian Academy, Okmulgee, Okmulgee County
Marquette Catholic School, Tulsa, Tulsa County
Messiah Lutheran School, Oklahoma City, Oklahoma County
Mingo Valley Christian School, Tulsa, Tulsa County
Oak Hall Episcopal School, Ardmore, Carter County
Oklahoma Bible Academy, Enid, Garfield County
Oklahoma Christian Academy, Edmond, Oklahoma County
Oklahoma Christian School, Edmond, Oklahoma County
Opportunity Center, Ponca City, Kay County
Parkview Adventist Academy, Oklahoma City, Oklahoma County
Ponca City Christian Academy, Ponca City, Kay County
Regent Preparatory School, Tulsa, Tulsa County
Rejoice Christian School, Owasso, Tulsa County
Riverfield Country Day School, Tulsa, Tulsa County
Rosary School, Oklahoma City, Oklahoma County
Sacred Heart Catholic School, Oklahoma City, Oklahoma County
Sallisaw Christian School, Sallisaw, Sequoyah County
School Of Saint Mary, Tulsa, Tulsa County
Southpark Christian School, Tulsa, Tulsa County
Southwest Covenant School, Yukon, Canadian County
St. Catherine Catholic School, Tulsa, Tulsa County
St. Charles Borromeo School, Warr Acres, Oklahoma County
St. Elizabeth Ann Seton School, Edmond, Oklahoma County
St. Eugene Catholic School, Oklahoma City, Oklahoma County
St. James Catholic School, Oklahoma City, Oklahoma County
St. John Nepomuk School, Yukon, Canadian County
St. John School, Bartlesville, Washington County
St. John's Episcopal School, Oklahoma City, Oklahoma County
St. John's Lutheran School, Moore, Cleveland County
St. Joseph Catholic School (Enid, Oklahoma), Enid, Garfield County
St. Joseph School, Muskogee, Muskogee County
St. Mary Catholic School, Lawton, Comanche County
St. Mary's School, Ponca City, Kay County
St. Mary's Catholic School, Guthrie, Logan County
St. Mary's Episcopal School, Edmond, Oklahoma County
St. Philip Neri Catholic School, Oklahoma City, Oklahoma County
St. Pius X Catholic School, Tulsa, Tulsa County
Sts. Peter And Paul School, Kingfisher, Kingfisher County
Sts. Peter And Paul School, Tulsa, Tulsa County
Summit Christian Academy (Oklahoma), Broken Arrow, Tulsa County
Tulsa Adventist Jr. Academy, Tulsa, Tulsa County
Victory Life Academy, Durant, Bryan County
Villa Teresa School, Oklahoma City, Oklahoma County
Western Oaks Baptist, Bethany, Oklahoma County
Western Oklahoma Christian School, Clinton, Custer County
Westminster School (Oklahoma), Oklahoma City, Oklahoma County
William Bradford Christian School, Pryor, Mayes County
Wright Christian Academy, Tulsa, Tulsa County

Schools Accredited by the National Association of Private Schools
PREACH UNTO THEM JESUS CHRISTIAN ACADEMY, Oklahoma City, Oklahoma NW 16th & Penn
Goodland Academy, Hugo, Choctaw County
McAlester Christian Academy, McAlester, Oklahoma, Pittsburg County
Overland Christian Schools, Overland Park, Kansas
Wildflower: An Acton Academy, Oklahoma City, Oklahoma County

Schools Accredited by the Association of Christian Schools International
Corn Bible Academy, Corn, Washita County
Crossings Christian School, Oklahoma City, Oklahoma County
Eagle Point Christian Academy, Sapulpa, Creek County]]
Oklahoma Bible Academy, Enid, Garfield County, Oklahoma
Lawton Christian School, Lawton, Comanche County, Oklahoma

See also
List of school districts in Oklahoma
List of vocational technical schools in Oklahoma
List of colleges and universities in Oklahoma

External sources
Oklahoma State Department of Education
Oklahoma Private School Accreditation Commission

 
Private